Khomeh may refer to:
Khomeh Olya, a village in Lorestan, Iran
Khomeh Sofla, a village in Lorestan, Iran
Khomeh Rural District, an administrative subdivision of Lorestan, Iran